Gunpowder & Sky is a media production and distribution company based in the United States. It makes documentaries and fictional programming aimed at millennials.

It was founded in January 2016 by Van Toffler, together with Floris Bauer and Otter Media, an American digital media company that was owned by AT&T and The Chernin Group and is currently part of Warner Bros. Discovery.

References

External links
Official website

Entertainment companies of the United States